Dieta may refer to:

 Spider genus Oxytate (synonym)
 Diet (assembly)